Kord Sara Kuh-e Pain (also Romanized as  Kord Sarā Kūh-e Pā’īn) is a village in Otaqvar Rural District, Otaqvar District, Langarud County, Gilan Province, Iran. At the 2006 census, its population was 32, in 12 families.

References 

Populated places in Langarud County